Woman Out of Control is the second solo album by Ray Parker Jr., released in 1983 on Arista Records. 

The album peaked at No. 45 on the Billboard 200. The single "I Still Can't Get Over Loving You" reached No. 12 on the Billboard Hot 100. 

It was remastered and expanded by Funky Town Grooves in 2012.

Critical reception
The Philadelphia Inquirer wrote that "except for a tedious exercise in synthesizer pop, this is a strong Parker album, full of catchy melodies and tart humor." Stereo Review thought that Parker "proves that it is possible to be thoroughly modern without modulating into high-tech punk."

Track listing

Personnel 
 Ray Parker Jr. – lead vocals, backing vocals, pianos, synthesizers, guitars, bass, drums 
 Eddie "Bongo" Brown – congas
 Ollie E. Brown – percussion 
 Jack Ashford – tambourine
 Charles Green – saxophones, flute
 Alex Brown – backing vocals 
 Arnell Carmichael – backing vocals 
 J.D. Nicholas – backing vocals 
 Anita Sherman – backing vocals 

Production
 Ray Parker Jr. – producer, engineer, recording, mixing 
 Steve Halquist – assistant engineer 
 Ria Lewerke – art direction 
 Leon Lecash – photography

References

External links
 Official website
 Ray Parker Jr 2012 Audio Interview at Soulinterviews.com

1983 albums
Ray Parker Jr. albums
Arista Records albums
Albums produced by Ray Parker Jr.